Lin Peng (born October 25, 1986) is a Chinese actress. Peng began her career by appearing in a Jackie Chan film Little Big Soldier.

Film

Television series

Discography

Albums

Singles

Awards

References

External links
 
 ChineseMov page
 Chinese Bio

21st-century Chinese actresses
Chinese television actresses
1986 births
Living people
Chinese stage actresses
Actresses from Dalian
Chinese film actresses
Central Academy of Drama alumni